Gangou Township (Mandarin: 甘沟乡) is a township in Minhe Hui and Tu Autonomous County, Haidong, Qinghai, China. In 2010, Gangou Township had a total population of 11,444: 5,851 males and 5,593 females: 2,810 aged under 14, 7,805 aged between 15 and 65 and 829 aged over 65.

References 
 

Township-level divisions of Qinghai
Haidong